Herpetogramma desmioides is a moth in the family Crambidae. It was described by George Hampson in 1899. It is found in Papua New Guinea, where it has been recorded from Fergusson Island, the largest of the D'Entrecasteaux Islands.

References

D
Endemic fauna of Papua New Guinea
Moths of Papua New Guinea
D'Entrecasteaux Islands
Moths described in 1899
Taxa named by George Hampson